The 1984 United States presidential election in Montana took place on November 6, 1984, and was part of the 1984 United States presidential election. Voters chose four representatives, or electors to the Electoral College, who voted for president and vice president.

Montana overwhelmingly voted for the Republican nominee, President Ronald Reagan, over the Democratic nominee, former Vice President Walter Mondale. Reagan won Montana by a landslide margin of 22.29%. , this is the last election in which Glacier County voted for a Republican presidential candidate and the last time until 2016 that Roosevelt County voted Republican. Reagan became the first ever Republican to win the White House without carrying Big Horn County.

Results

Results by county

See also
 United States presidential elections in Montana
 Presidency of Ronald Reagan

References

Montana
1984
1984 Montana elections